Neobalanocarpus is a monotypic genus of plants in the family Dipterocarpaceae. The single species, Neobalanocarpus heimii, is a tropical hardwood tree. Common names for the tree and its wood products include chengal, chan ta khien, chi-ngamat, takian chan, and takian chantamaeo. Chengal is considered the number one wood (classified as heavy hardwood) of Malaysia and export of logs is prohibited due to its scarcity. The species is listed as endangered on the IUCN Red list.

Distribution 

Neobalanocarpus heimii is endemic to the Malay Peninsula and grows under quite a range of conditions of soils and topography in Peninsular Malaysia (and southern Thailand) from low flat semi-swamp to hills, but appears to thrive best on undulating land with light sandy soils. See Wildlife of Malaysia. It is now extinct in Singapore, and possibly extinct in Thailand.

Description 
Neobalanocarpus heimii can grow to be a large tree over 60 metres tall, with a straight, unbranched trunk, averaging 90cm in diameter, and with obvious supporting buttresses. Its simple, leathery leaves are arranged alternately, and are elliptical to lanceolate, between 7 to 17 cm in length, and 2.5 to 5cm in width. 

Uses 

Chengal has been used for furniture making, house and boat-building. Despite its extreme strength and hardness, chengal is highly flexible before it is fully cured, making it suitable for plank bending (boat building). It is also highly resistant to rot, fungi and mildew. In addition, chengal has a relatively low shrinkage ratio (only inferior to teak), which makes it excellent for applications where it undergoes periodic changes in moisture. Chengal, like teak, has the unusual properties of being both an excellent structural timber for framing, planking, etc., while at the same time being easily worked and finished to a high degree.

Chengal may be varnished but does not necessarily need a "finish". The wood naturally weathers to a silver-grey colour similar to teak. It can be easily planed, drilled or turned.  Nailing is very difficult and the wood often has to be pre-drilled.

Durability 

The timber is classified as naturally durable and is normally very resistant to termite attack and fungal infestation. Under graveyard test conditions, untreated specimens of size 50 mm × 50 mm × 600 mm lasted 9 years. Treated specimen of the same size and test conditions lasted about 19 years. Untreated railway sleepers of size 238 mm × 125 mm × 1,950 mm laid under severe environmental conditions gave an average service life of 19 years. Termites do not attack the sound timber.

References

External links 
Woodwizard Information site

Flora of Asia
Forestry in Malaysia
Dipterocarpaceae
Monotypic Malvales genera
Taxonomy articles created by Polbot